Rania Abouzeid is a Lebanese Australian journalist who has extensively covered the war in Syria.

Biography

Rania Abouzeid was born in New Zealand to Lebanese parents. She was raised in Australia regularly visiting Beirut to see family during holidays. Abouzeid attended the University of Melbourne, Australia. Since then she has worked for the New Yorker, TIME, Politico, The Guardian and many other publications. Abouzeid is based in Beirut. In 2014 her story The Jihad next door won a George Polk award as well as the Michael Kelly Award. Abouzeid won the Kurt Schork Award in International Journalism in 2013. As well as her print work, Abouzeid has created documentaries, her first being Syria: Behind Rebel Lines. She has also written books about the conflict. Abouzeid has been awarded fellowships from the European Council on Foreign Relations, Harvard, Columbia and New America. Her first book won the Cornelius Ryan Award.

Books

 No Turning Back. Life, Loss, and Hope in Wartime Syria, 2018
 Sisters of the War, 2020

Sources

Living people
Year of birth missing (living people)
Lebanese women journalists
Australian women journalists